Biarritz Olympique Pays Basque, usually known simply as Biarritz, is a French professional rugby union team based in the Basque city of Biarritz, Nouvelle-Aquitaine which competes in the Pro D2, the second division of French rugby. Biarritz plays its home matches at the Parc des Sports Aguiléra, which is a multi-use stadium in Biarritz and which has a capacity of around 13,500 people, though for games that need a larger capacity, Biarritz may play at the Estadio Anoeta in San Sebastián. Biarritz play in red and white colours. Biarritz won a number of major honors, including the French championship on five occasions.

Biarritz Olympique was formed in 1913 through a merger of the Biarritz Stade and Biarritz Sporting Club rugby teams. Biarritz made their way to the final of the French championship for the first time in the 1934 season where they were defeated by Bayonne. The following season they claimed their first championship, defeating Perpignan in the final. That decade Biarritz met Perpignan twice again in the final, winning one and losing one. It would not be until 1992 when the club made the final again, and then a decade later, winning the championship in 2002. The club won back-to-back titles in 2005 and 2006, and were runners-up in Europe in 2006 and 2010 as well. In 2013–14, Biarritz won just five matches out of 26, and were relegated to the Pro D2 League. In 2020–21, they were promoted back to the Top 14 after a 7 year absence.

History

Early years
The history of the club extends back to the late 19th century. An athletic club, Biarritz Stade (named that, in 1902) opened up a rugby quarter. In 1909, the Biarritz Sporting Club was established. On 26 April 1913, the fusion of the two clubs took place. The new name of the club was Biarritz Olympique and its inaugural president was M. P. Campagne. On 13 May 1934, Biarritz Olympique played in the final of the French premiership; they were however, defeated by Aviron Bayonnais 13 points to 8 at Stade des Ponts Jumeaux in Toulouse in front of 18,000 people. It was the only all-Basque final and is still the final in which the two contenders were separated by the shortest distance (3 miles), outside the all-Parisian finals of the late 19th century.

A year later, Biarritz again found themselves in the final of the national championship, this time against USA Perpignan. They emerged victorious, winning three points to nil, claiming their first ever national championship. The success continued in the latter stages of the decade. In the 1938 championship, Biarritz again met USAP in the final, though this time, the Perpignan club were able to get the win, Biarritz losing 11 points to six. A year later, the two clubs met in the final again, with Biarritz coming out as the better club on the day, winning six points to nil, and claiming the second national championship. But for almost 50 years, Biarritz was not going to feature prominently in the French league.

The 1980s and 90s
It was not until the late 1980s that BO, as it is nicknamed, was going to reach the top again. In 1989 Biarritz contested their first Challenge Yves du Manoir final since the 1937 season. However, they were defeated by RC Narbonne 18–12 in the final. In 1992, Biarritz made it to the national final, played at Parc des Princes in Paris. However, Biarritz went down to RC Toulon 19 points to 14. In the 1997–98 season, Biarritz competed in their first European Rugby Cup competition, playing in the European Challenge Cup. Biarritz won three of their six fixtures, and did not make it past the pool stages. The 1998–99 season was similar to the previous, though they were able to win one more of their pool fixtures, but finished third in the pool standings after other French clubs Agen and Brive.

In their third Challenge Cup, Biarritz only lost one pool game and finished first in the standings. However, they were knocked out in the quarter-finals by English club Bristol. As well as the success in the Challenge Cup, in the 1999–00 season, they also won the Coupe de France for the first time since 1937, defeating CA Brive 24–13 in the final. Biarritz also earned qualification for the Heineken Cup.

2000s

The club finished at the top of their pool In the Heineken Cup, but were eliminated by Irish team Munster, losing 38–29 in the quarter-finals at Thomond Park. In the 2001–02 Heineken Cup Biarritz did not make the finals, finishing second in their pool, winning two of their six pool fixtures.

In 2002, Biarritz made their way to the domestic final for the first time in a decade. They defeated Agen 25 to 22 at Stade de France in Saint-Denis in front of 78,457. That season they were also runners-up to La Rochelle in the Coupe de France final, losing 21–19.  The 2002–03 Heineken Cup was also a success for Biarritz, finishing at the top of their pool standings, they were quarter-finalists, but lost to Leinster 18–13 at Lansdowne Road in Dublin.

The 2003–04 Heineken Cup was the best-ever for Biarritz, as they made it to the semi-finals for the first time. They finished at the top of their pool and defeated the Llanelli Scarlets in the quarter-finals. They lost to fellow French club Toulouse 19–11 in the semi-finals. In 2004–05 Biarritz dropped only the one pool game against the London Wasps and finished at the top of their pool. They then defeated Munster in the quarter-finals, to repeat their success of the previous season by making the semi-finals. They, however, lost to Stade Français, 20–17 at Parc des Princes. More success followed in 2005, where they defeated the Stade Français club 37 points to 34 in the domestic final after a very rugged challenge.

In the year 2006, they made it to the Heineken Cup final where they met Munster. Although they lost their first pool game to the Saracens, Biarritz won the remaining matches and finished at the top of their pool, and defeated English clubs Sale and Bath in the finals to make the final. They lost the compelling game 19–23. They were, however, able to make it to the final of the 2005–06 Top 14, where they met Toulouse. Biarritz led nine points to six at half time but stormed to victory in the second half, the final score being 40 to 13, making Biarritz back-to-back winners. In the 2006–07 Heineken Cup Biarritz won all six of their pool games, topping their group with 29 points. They met fellow pool team Northampton Saints at Estadio Anoeta in the quarter-finals: Northampton upset Biarritz 8–7.  In 2010, after finishing atop their pool, Biarritz defeated Ospreys and Munster, both at the Anoeta, and lost a hard-fought Heineken Cup final to Toulouse, 21–19, at Stade de France in Saint-Denis on Saturday, 22 May.

On 18 May 2012, Biarritz beat Top 14 rivals Toulon 21-18 in the 2012 Amlin Challenge Cup Final at Twickenham Stoop.

Biarritz played poorly during the 2013–14 Top 14 season, and ended up being relegated to the Rugby Pro D2 for the 2014–15 season.

Stadium

Biarritz play their home matches at the Parc des Sports Aguiléra, which is a multi-use stadium in Biarritz. The stadium is used mostly for rugby and is able to hold around 13,500 people. Apart from Biarritz home games, the ground also hosted an international between the French Barbarians and Argentina.

Biarritz sometimes move larger games across the border to Estadio Anoeta in Donostia/San Sebastián, Spain. The Anoeta is the nearest stadium to Biarritz with a suitable capacity for matches such as a Heineken Cup semi-final, which must be played at a venue which can hold at least 20,000 spectators. The Anoeta holds well above that limit, at slightly over 32,000. The first such match held there was a victory over Munster in a quarter final of the 2004–05 Heineken Cup. In 2005–06 Biarritz played and won both their Heineken Cup quarter and semi-finals at the venue. The 2006–07 quarter-final against Northampton was also played there. In the 2009–10 Top 14 season, Biarritz took two league matches to the Anoeta—their home leg of the Northern Basque derby against Bayonne, and a home match against fellow traditional power Toulouse. They also played both of their knockout matches leading up to the 2010 Heineken Cup final at the Anoeta, defeating Ospreys in the quarter-finals and Munster in the semi-finals.

Colours and name
Biarritz Olympique usually play in red and white colours. Green is the club's tertiary colour, as red, white and green are the traditional colours that represent the Basque Country. Their home uniform consists of red socks and shorts with a predominantly white shirt with red sides. A second jersey also has one green arm. For the 2015-16 season, their kit is produced by Macron. The main shirt sponsor is Capgemini.

In 1998, it adopted its current name (Biarritz Olympique Pays Basque), which refers to the club's Basque heritage the name is often abbreviated as BOPB. The club logo is a red and white shield with the B and O in the middle. The words Pays Basque also appear on either side of the logo in green.

Supporters
The Biarritz supporters sometimes wave the Basque flag in the stands. Traditional Basque songs are also heard, as Basque supporters have a reputation for being very good singers. The Parc des Sports Aguilera is considered an intimidating venue to play at, with Biarritz supporters having a reputation for being very vocal.

Honours
 French championship
 Champions: 1935, 1939, 2002, 2005, 2006
 Runners-up: 1934, 1938, 1992
 Heineken Cup:
 Runners-up: 2006, 2010
 European Challenge Cup:
 Champions: 2012
 Challenge Yves du Manoir:
 Champions: 1937, 2000
 Runners-up: 1989
 Coupe de France/Coupe de la Ligue
 Runners-up: 2002

Finals results

French championship

Heineken Cup

European Challenge Cup

Challenge Yves du Manoir

Coupe de France

European record

Current standings

Current squad

The Biarritz squad for the 2022–23 season is:

Espoirs squad

The Biarritz Olympique Espoirs squad is:

Notable former players

 
  Federico Martín Aramburú
  Marcelo Bosch
  Manuel Carizza
  Agustín Creevy
  Martín Gaitán
  Francisco Gómez Kodela
  Eusebio Guiñazú
  Luke Burton
  Rodney Davies
  Dane Haylett-Petty
  Leroy Houston
  Karmichael Hunt
  Jack Isaac
  Joe Roff
  Haig Sare
  Evan Olmstead
  Steffon Armitage
  Iain Balshaw
  Daniel Caprice
  Ayoola Erinle
  Magnus Lund
  Richard Pool-Jones
  Sireli Bobo
  Seremaia Burotu
  Adriu Delai
  Nemia Soqeta
  Kalivati Tawake
  Benoit August
  Denis Avril
  Marc Baget
  Fabien Barcella
  Pierre Bernard
  Jean-Pascal Barraque
  Philippe Bernat-Salles
  Serge Betsen
  Philippe Bidabé
  Serge Blanco
  Sébastien Bonetti
  Benoît Bourrust
  Guillaume Boussès
  Nicolas Brusque
  Romain Cabannes
  Michel Celaya
  Fabien Cibray
  Jean Condom
  David Couzinet
  Valentin Courrent
  Benjamin Dambielle
  Clément Darbo
  André Darrieussecq
  Thibault Dubarry
  Julien Dufau
  Julien Dupuy
  Thierry Dusautoir
  Pépito Elhorga
  Jean-Martin Etchenique
  Florian Faure
  Fernand Forgues
  Philippe Gimbert
  Jean-Baptiste Gobelet
  Jean-Michel Gonzalez
  André Haget
  Francis Haget
  Henri Haget
  Kylan Hamdaoui
  Imanol Harinordoquy
  Arnaud Héguy
  Marcel Jol
  Thibault Lacroix
  Patrice Lagisquet
  Raphaël Lakafia
  Jean Larribau
  Grégoire Lascubé
  Wenceslas Lauret
  Benoît Lecouls
  Yann Lesgourgues
  Marc Lièvremont
  Thomas Lièvremont
  Laurent Magnaval
  Sylvain Marconnet
  Jimmy Marlu
  Legi Matiu
  Alexandre Menini
  Arnaud Mignardi
  Christophe Milhères
  Franck Montanella
  Benjamin Noirot
  Olivier Olibeau
  Pascal Ondarts
  Julien Peyrelongue
  Alexandre Roumat
  Olivier Roumat
  David Roumieu
  Romain Ruffenach
  Julien Saubade
  Benjamin Thiéry
  Jérôme Thion
  Teddy Thomas
  Sébastien Tillous-Borde
  Damien Traille
  Yvan Watremez
  Dimitri Yachvili
  Vakhtang Akhobadze
  Santiago Dellapè
  Andrea Masi
  Gonzalo Padro
  Frano Botica
  Campbell Johnstone
  Glen Osborne
  Francis Saili
  Daniel Waenga
  Erik Lund
  Petru Bălan
  Ovidiu Toniţa
  Henry Fa'afili
  Census Johnston
  Kas Lealamanua
  Nick De Luca
  Wicus Blaauw
  Jacques Cronjé
  Willie du Plessis
  Philip van der Walt
  Ashwin Willemse
  Takudzwa Ngwenya
  Thretton Palamo
  Ueleni Fono
  Kurt Morath
  Samiu Vahafolau
  Aled Brew
  Ben Broster

See also
 List of rugby union clubs in France
 Rugby union in France

References

External links

  Biarritz Olympique Pays Basques Official website
 Biarritz Olympique anthem

 
French rugby union clubs
Rugby clubs established in 1913
Organizations based in Northern Basque Country
Sport in Biarritz
1913 establishments in France